Indore State, also known as Holkar State, was a kingdom in India. Its rulers belonged to the Holkar dynasty of Maratha Empire. After 1857, Indore became a 19-gun salute Maratha princely state (a rare high rank) under the British Raj.

Indore state was located in the present-day Indian state of Madhya Pradesh. The capital of the state was the city of Indore. The state had an area of 24,605 km2 and a population of 1,325,089 in 1931. Other important towns besides Indore were Rampura, Khargone, Maheshwar, Mehidpur, Barwaha, and Bhanpura; there were a total of 3,368 villages.

History

By 1720, the headquarters of the local pargana (an Indian local administrative unit) was transferred from Kampel to Indore due to the increasing commercial activity in the city. On 18 May 1724, the Nizam accepted the rights of the Maratha Peshwa Baji Rao I to collect chauth (taxes) from the area. In 1733, the Peshwa assumed full control of Malwa and appointed his commander Malhar Rao Holkar as the Subhedar (Governor) of the province.

On 29 July 1732, Bajirao Peshwa-I granted Holkar State by merging 28 and a half parganas to Malhar Rao Holkar, the founding ruler of the Holkar dynasty. His daughter-in-law Ahilyabai Holkar moved the state's capital to Maheshwar in 1767, but Indore remained an important commercial and military centre.

After the defeat of the Holkar rulers in the Third Anglo-Maratha War, an agreement was signed on 6 January 1818 with the British and the Indore State became a British protectorate. The Holkar dynasty was able to continue to rule Indore as a princely state mainly owing to the efforts of Dewan (chief minister) Tatya Jog.

The capital was moved from Maheshwar to Indore on 3 November 1818 and the Indore Residency, a political residency with a British resident, was established in the city. Later, Indore would be established as the headquarters of the British Central India Agency. In 1906, electrical infrastructure was installed in the city while a fire brigade was established in 1909. By 1918, the first master plan of the city was drawn by architect and town planner Patrick Geddes.

During the period of Maharaja Tukoji Rao Holkar II (1852–86), efforts were made for the planned development and industrial development of Indore. During the reigns of Maharaja Shivaji Rao Holkar, Maharaja Tukoji Rao Holkar III, and Maharaja Yeshwant Rao Holkar, business flourished thanks to the railways that had been introduced in the state in 1875.

In 1926, Maharaja Tukoji Rao III Holkar XIII abdicated after being implicated in a murder case involving a court dancer and her lover.

After the independence of India in 1947, Indore State, along with a number of neighbouring princely states, acceded to India. Yashwant Rao Holkar II, the last ruler of the state, signed the instrument of accession to the Indian Union on 1 January 1950. The territories of the state became part of the new Indian state of Madhya Bharat.

Rulers
The kings of Indore held the title of 'Maharaja' Holkar. The rulers of the state were entitled to a 19 gun salute by the British authorities.
The Holkar State Darbar (Court) was composed of many Jagirdars, Sardars, Istamuradars, Mankaris and Zamindars.

Maharajas

Diwans of Indore
c. 1808 – 1811: Bala Ram Seth
1811 – December 1817: Ganpal Rao
1818 – April 1826: Tantia Jog (Tatya Jog) (died 1826)

April 1826 – 1827?: Raoji Trimbak
1827: Daji Bakhshi
1827? – 1829: Appa Rao Krishna
1829 – 1834?: Madhav Rao Phadnis
April 1834 – November 1836: Sardar Revaji Rao Phanse
1836 – 1839?: Abbaji Ballal (or Bhawani Bin) 
1839? – 1840?: Bhao Rao Phanse (1st time)
1840? – October 1841: Narayan Rao Palshikar
1841 – 1842?: the ruler
1842? – 1848: Bhao Rao Phanse (2nd time)
1848 – 1849?: Ram Rao Palshikar
1852 – 1872: Bhawani Singh Dube
1872 – 1875: Sir T. Madhava Rao (1828–1891)
1875 – 1881: R. Raghunatha Rao (1st time) (1831–1912)
1881? – 1884?: Shahamat Ali
1884 – 1886: Nana Moroji Trilokekar
1886 – 1888: R. Raghunatha Rao (2nd time) (s.a.)
c. 1890s: Balkrishna Atmaram Gupte
1890–1913: Sir Shri Rai Bhadhur Nanak Chand Ji Airen (as First Prime Minister Of State)
4 April 1913 – October 1914: Narayan Ganesh Chandravarkar
1914 – 1916: ....
1916 – 1921: Ram Prasad Dube (1st time. Nephew of Bhawani Singh Dube.)
November 1921 – 1923?: Chettur Sankaran Nair (1857–1934)
1923 – 1926: Ram Prasad Dube (2nd time)

Prime ministers
1890–1913: Sir Shri Rai Bhadhur Nanak Chand Ji Airen
February 1926 – 1939: Siremal Bapna (s.a.)
1939 – 1942?: Sardar Dina Nath
1942 – 1947: Raja Gyannath Madan
1947: R.G. Horton
 1 September 1947 – 3 January 1948: E.P. Menon
January 1948: N.C. Mehta
26 January 1948 – March 1948: M.V. Bhide

British Residents
British Residents of the Indore Residency.
1840–1844: Sir Claude Martin Wade (1794–1861)
1845–1859: Robert North Collie Hamilton (1802–1887)
1859–1861: Sir Richmond Campbell Shakespear (1812–1861)
1861–1869: Richard John Meade (1821–1899)
1869–1881: Henry D. Daly
1881–1888: Henry Lepel-Griffin (1838–1908)
1888–1890: P.F. Henvey
1890–1894: R.J. Crosthwaite
1894–1899: David W.K. Barr
1899–1902: Robert Henry Jennings
1902–1903: Francis Younghusband (1863–1942)
1903–1907: Oswald Vivian Bosanquet (1st time) (1866–1933)
1907–1909: James Levett Kaye (1861–1917)
1909–1910: Charles Beckford Luard
1910–1916: Charles Lennox Russell
1916–1919: Oswald Vivian Bosanquet (2nd time) (s.a.)
1919?–1921: Francis Granville Beville
1921–1924: Denys Brooke Blakeway (1870–1933)
1924–1929: Sir Reginald Glancy 
March 1927 – October 1927: Edward Herbert Kealy (acting for Glancy)
1929–1930: H.R.N. Pritchard
1930–1931: Frederick Bailey 
1931–1932: G.M. Ogilvie
1933 – 21 March 1935: Rawdon James MacNabb (1883–1935)
1935–1940: Kenneth Samuel Fitze (1887–1960)
1940–1942: Gerald Thomas Fisher
1942–1946: Walter F. Campbell
1946–1947: Henry Mortimer Poulton (b. 1898 –  d. 1973)

British Agents

Agents to the Governor-General for the Central India Agency. The headquarters of the agent were at Indore.
1845–1854: Robert North Collie Hamilton (s.a.)
1854–1899: the British Residents in Indore
1899–1900: David W.K. Barr
Mar 1900–1905: Charles S. Bayley
1905–1910: Hugh Daly
1910–1912: Michael Francis O'Dwyer (1864–1910)
1912–1913: John B. Wood
1913–1916: Oswald Vivian Bosanquet (s.a.)
1916–1944: the British Residents in Indore
1944–1946: Walter Campbell
1946–1947: Henry Mortimer Poulton (1898–1973)

See also
List of Maratha dynasties and states
List of princely states of British India (by region)
Maratha
Political integration of India
Maheshwar
Rajwada

References

External links

Santa Ana's Richest Resident, The Maharajah of Indore 
Royal Family of Indore

 

1732 establishments in India
1818 establishments in India
1950 disestablishments in India
Former monarchies of Asia
History of Indore
Princely states of Madhya Pradesh
Holkar